Azarsi-ye Babal Konar (also Romanized as Āzārsī-ye Bābol Kenār) is a village in Deraz Kola Rural District, Babol Kenar District, Babol County, Mazandaran Province, Iran. At the 2006 census, its population was 219, in 50 families.

References 

Populated places in Babol County